The U.S. consulate in Herat, Afghanistan was attacked on September 13, 2013 by a group of Taliban militants. Reports indicated that the assault began at 5:30 am on the front gate of the consulate. A large truck drove up to the consulate's primary vehicle entry point and detonated a massive improvised explosive charge, causing extensive damage. A minivan carrying an assault team armed with assault rifles and rocket-propelled grenades arrived and opened fire, moving into the consulate compound. Then, the driver of the minivan ignited a bomb inside the minivan, which exploded a short time afterwards. Eight Afghan members of the consulate's guard force and one Afghan police officer were killed. An unknown number of bystanders were wounded. A gun battle ensued, and all seven attackers were killed. No Americans were killed or seriously injured. The U.S. Department of State awarded Heroism Awards to several of the consulate's defenders.

The Taliban took credit for the attack in an emailed statement.

In a press release, the United Nations condemned the attack "in the strongest terms."

See also
 2014 attack on Indian consulate in Herat

References

2013 murders in Afghanistan
Mass murder in 2013
Mass shootings in Afghanistan
Car and truck bombings in Afghanistan
US consulate in Herat
Herat US consulate
Islamic terrorist incidents in 2013
US consulate in Herat
History of Herat
September 2013 events in Afghanistan
Afghanistan–United States relations
Attacks in Afghanistan in 2013